Jacobus Theodorus Wilhelmus "Co" Prins (5 June 1938 – 26 September 1987) was a Dutch former association football player. He played 184 matches for football club Ajax Amsterdam from 1959 to 1966 where he scored 60 goals. He played for the German football team 1. FC Kaiserslautern in the mid-sixties, being then one of the few foreign football professionals in Germany.

Prins earned his first international cap on 30 November 1960, in the Netherlands' 4–0 friendly match defeat to Czechoslovakia in Prague and won his tenth and last cap in a 0–0 World Cup qualifier draw with Switzerland on 17 November 1965 in Amsterdam.

As an actor, Prins played Dutch football player and Allied POW Pieter Van Beck in the film Escape to Victory in 1981.

He died of a heart attack while playing in a match in 1987.

References

External links 

 

1938 births
1987 deaths
Dutch footballers
Dutch expatriate footballers
Netherlands international footballers
National Professional Soccer League (1967) players
Pittsburgh Phantoms players
AFC Ajax players
Eredivisie players
Eerste Divisie players
Footballers from Amsterdam
Dutch football managers
National Professional Soccer League (1967) coaches
Association football players who died while playing
1. FC Kaiserslautern players
Bundesliga players
Dutch expatriate sportspeople in Germany
Expatriate footballers in Germany
North American Soccer League (1968–1984) players
Dutch expatriate sportspeople in the United States
Expatriate soccer players in the United States
New York Generals players
MVV Maastricht players
SBV Vitesse players
Helmond Sport players
Association football forwards
20th-century Dutch male actors
Sport deaths in Belgium